Graham Morris (born 28 March 1964) is a British diver. He competed in the men's 3 metre springboard event at the 1988 Summer Olympics.

References

External links
 

1964 births
Living people
British male divers
Olympic divers of Great Britain
Divers at the 1988 Summer Olympics
People from Prestatyn
Sportspeople from Denbighshire